Chapter Four Uganda is an independent non-profit human rights organization in Kampala Uganda dedicated to the protection of civil liberties and human rights protection.

It was founded in April 2013 by Nicholas Opiyo.

It derives its name from the bill of rights contained under chapter four of the constitution of the republic of Uganda.

Focus 
Chapter Four Uganda focuses on civic space, digital rights, equality and non-discrimination, and LGBT rights. It has a mission of providing a robust, strategic and non-discriminatory legal response to the abuse of civil liberties. Chapter Four also focuses on traditionally under represented and under served groups and individuals in the community, for example, it provides free legal representation to the vulnerable and marginalized communities like the LGBTQ+.

Location 
Chapter Four Uganda is located at plot 2 wampewo avenue Kampala.

References 

2013 establishments in Uganda
Human rights organisations based in Uganda
Organisations based in Kampala